Kamendin is an urban neighborhood of Belgrade, the capital of Serbia. It is located in Belgrade's municipality of Zemun, in the northwest section of Zemun. It adjoins the neighborhood of Zemun Polje on the west, it extends to the north in the direction of Batajnica while in the southeast it makes an urban connection in the direction of the Nova Galenika and Goveđi Brod industrial zones. The neighborhood was constructed in the 1990s and was intended as the eastern extension of Zemun Polje and the future urban connection of the urban Zemun and Batajnica. A residential area with short buildings, it has many so-called social dwellings, for refugees and displaced Romani families and is generally not considered an attractive location despite being one of the newest neighborhoods of Belgrade.

In November 2017 a construction of new 270 apartments for the refugees from the Yugoslav wars began. Projected deadline is January 2019, when 800 people should move in the new buildings.

References

Sources

External links 

Neighborhoods of Belgrade
Romani communities in Serbia